Joseph Adams House may refer to:

in the United States
(by state)
Joseph T. Adams House, Georgetown, Delaware
Joseph Frederick Adams House, Bluff, Utah
Joseph Adams House (Layton, Utah)

See also
Adams House (disambiguation)